Shann Ray (born in Billings, Montana, on October 3, 1967) is an American poet, novelist, and scholar of forgiveness. He writes poetry and literary fiction under the name Shann Ray in honor of his mother Saundra Rae, and social science as Shann Ray Ferch.  He is the author of the novel American Copper (Unbridled Books, 2015), American Masculine: Stories (Graywolf Press, 2011), Forgiveness and Power in the Age of Atrocity (Rowman & Littlefield, 2011), Blood Fire Vapor Smoke: Stories (Unsolicited Press, 2019), Sweetclover: Poems (Lost Horse Press, 2019), Atomic Theory 7: Poems (Resource Publications, 2020) and Balefire: Poems (Lost Horse Press, 2014).  He is also the editor with Larry C. Spears of Conversations on Servant Leadership: Insights on Human Courage in Life and Work (SUNY Press) and The Spirit of Servant Leadership (Paulist Press), and the editor with Jiying Song of Servant Leadership and Forgiveness: How Leaders Help Heal the Heart of the World (SUNY Press). His work has appeared worldwide in literary magazines and scientific journals, including Poetry (magazine), McSweeney's, Poetry International, Narrative Magazine, the Journal of Counseling and Development, the Journal of Leadership and Organizational Studies, and the Voices of Servant Leadership Series.

His awards include a National Endowment for the Arts Literature Fellowship, the American Book Award, two High Plains Book Awards, the Foreword Book of the Year Readers Choice Award, and the Bakeless Prize, formerly given annually in fiction, poetry, and nonfiction  a Fellowship of the Bread Loaf Writers' Conference, the Subterrain Poetry Prize, the Crab Creek Review Fiction Prize, the Pacific Northwest Inlander Short Fiction Award, the Poetry Quarterly Poetry Prize, and the Ruminate Short Story Prize.  His poems and stories have been selected for the Best New Poets and the Best of McSweeney's anthologies.

Among other leading literary venues in America, Ray's poems and stories have appeared in Prairie Schooner, Northwest Review, the William and Mary Review, Montana Quarterly, Borderlands, the South Dakota Review, and StoryQuarterly.

Ray's work in leadership and forgiveness studies has garnered critical acclaim. He has served as a panelist for the National Endowment for the Humanities, as a research psychologist for the Centers for Disease Control, and as a visiting scholar in the Netherlands, Colombia, Canada, the Philippines, and South Africa. He is the editor of The International Journal of Servant Leadership, and currently teaches leadership and forgiveness studies in the doctoral program in Leadership Studies at Gonzaga University.

Notes

External links 
 Shann Ray website

Writers from Washington (state)
Gonzaga University faculty
1967 births
Living people
Writers from Billings, Montana
American Book Award winners